Hungaria (minor planet designation: 434 Hungaria) is a relatively small asteroid orbiting in the inner asteroid belt. It is an E-type (high-albedo) asteroid. It is the namesake of the Hungaria asteroids, which orbit the Sun on the inside of the 1:4 Kirkwood gap, standing out of the core of the asteroid belt.

It was discovered by Max Wolf on 11 September 1898 at the University of Heidelberg. It was named after Hungary, which hosted an astronomical meeting  in 1898 in Budapest.

It is thought that there may be a genetic connection between 434 Hungaria and 3103 Eger and the aubrites.

See also
 Aubrite
 E-type asteroid
 Hungaria family
 1025 Riema
 1103 Sequoia
 1453 Fennia
 1750 Eckert
 7187 Isobe

References

External links 
 Lightcurve plot of 434 Hungaria, Palmer Divide Observatory, B. D. Warner (2011)
SDSS image taken on 01APR2003 /Fermats Brother
 Relation between 434 Hungaria, 3103 Eger, and e-type asteroids
 Near IR-spectra of 3 Hungaria family asteroids: 4483 Petofi, 3169 Ostro and 3940 Larion
 Asteroid Lightcurve Database (LCDB), query form (info )
 Dictionary of Minor Planet Names, Google books
 Asteroids and comets rotation curves, CdR – Observatoire de Genève, Raoul Behrend
 Discovery Circumstances: Numbered Minor Planets (1)-(5000) – Minor Planet Center
 
 

Hungaria asteroids
Hungaria
Hungaria
E-type asteroids (Tholen)
Xe-type asteroids (SMASS)
18980911